Khlong Sip Kao Junction railway station is a railway station located in Yothaka Subdistrict, Bang Nam Priao District, Chachoengsao. Khlong Sip Kao is named after Khlong 19 (Sip Kao is 19 in Thai), which is a man-made irrigation canal, located nearby. It is also the junction for the Eastern Line Aranyaprathet Main Line and the Phra Phutthachai Line for freight trains only to Kaeng Khoi Junction.

Khlong Sip Kao Junction opened in January 1925 as part of the Eastern Line Chachoengsao Junction–Kabin Buri section. It opened as a halt, and eventually became a junction in August 1995, as the Phra Phutthachai Line opened.

Train services 
 Ordinary train No. 275/276 Bangkok–Aranyaprathet–Bangkok
 Ordinary train No. 277/278 Bangkok–Kabin Buri–Bangkok
 Ordinary train No. 279/280 Bangkok–Aranyaprathet–Bangkok
 Ordinary train No. 281/282 Bangkok–Kabin Buri–Bangkok
 Ordinary train No. 371/372 Bangkok–Prachin Buri–Bangkok

References 
 
 

Railway stations in Thailand
Railway stations opened in 1925